Merritt Secondary is a public high school in Merritt, British Columbia, part of School District 58 Nicola-Similkameen.

References

High schools in British Columbia